The Grampian condition is a facet of planning Scottish case law established by Grampian Regional Council v City of Aberdeen District Council (1984) 47 P&CR 633.  The term is commonly also used in England and Wales.

A "Grampian condition" is a planning condition attached to a decision notice that prevents the start of a development until off-site works have been completed on land not controlled by the applicant.

Sources
http://www.scotland.gov.uk/Publications/2001/08/9822/File-1

See also
Scots law
Town and Country Planning Act 1990
Town & Country Planning (Scotland) Act 1997

United Kingdom planning law
Town and country planning in Scotland
Scottish case law
1984 in Scotland
1984 in British law
Condition